Sorhagenia taurensis is a moth in the family Cosmopterigidae. It is found in Asia Minor.

Adults have been recorded in mid July.

Etymology
The species is named for the type location, the Taurus Mountains.

References

Moths described in 2003
Chrysopeleiinae